Atletico Piombino is an Italian association football club located in Piombino, Tuscany. It currently plays in Eccellenza. Its colors are light blue and black.

History
The club was founded in 1921 as U.S. Piombino Calcio and spent three seasons in Serie B in which it defeated more famous teams such as A.S.Roma and Calcio Catania. The side disbanded in 1996 and was refounded as A.S. Piombino. It changed its denomination to the current one in 2004, but from the fans it's called as only "il Piombino".
Piombino actually play in Eccellenza Toscana, the fifth level of Italian football.

References

External links
 Atletico Piombino official website

Atletico Piombino
Football clubs in Tuscany
Association football clubs established in 1921
Serie B clubs
Atletico Piombino